Kaiping, alternately romanized in Cantonese as Hoiping, is a county-level city in Guangdong Province, China. It is located ín the western section of the Pearl River Delta and administered as part of the prefecture-level city of Jiangmen. The surrounding area, especially Sze Yup, is the ancestral homeland of many overseas Chinese, particularly in the United States. The locals speak a variant of the Sze Yup  dialect]].

History
During the Northern Song dynasty (960–1127), Kaiping was under the administration of Xin'an county
Under the Qing (1649),  made up part of the commandery of Shiuhing (Zhaoqing). It was promoted to county-level city status in 1993.

Administration
Administratively, Kaiping is administered as part of the prefecture-level city of Jiangmen.

Geography
Kaiping consists of broken terrain, mostly either rocky or swampy, with only a third of the land arable. The county is shaped like a giant question mark (see map, in pink) and includes rural areas as well as three port cities: Changsha, Xinchang, and Dihai.

Notable people

 Wing-tsit Chan: Chinese American scholar 
 Ed Chau: member of the California State Assembly
 George Chow: member of the Legislative Assembly of British Columbia
 Yun Gee: Chinese American artist
 Víctor Joy Way: Chinese Peruvian politician
 Betty Kwan Chinn: Chinese American philanthropist
 Lee Quo-wei (1918–2013): former Hong Kong banker
 Liang Xiang: former Governor of Hainan
 Betty Ong: American flight attendant aboard American Airlines Flight 11
 Jean Quan: former mayor of Oakland, California
 Bing Thom: Chinese Canadian architect and urban designer 
 Szeto Wah (1931–2011):  Hong Kong politician

 Szutu, Chiu: scholar, his publishing included inter generation of Chinese new zealanders,the biography of architecet Ron Fong

 Delbert E. Wong: Los Angeles County jurist who was the first judge in the continental United States of Chinese descent
 Ken Hom: Chinese-American chef, BBC TV presenter, and author

Sights

Kaiping Diaolou 

Kaiping Diaolous are fortified multi-storey towers constructed in the village countryside of mainly the Kaiping area.  They were built from the early Qing Dynasty to the early 20th century, reaching a peak in the 1920s and 1930s, with the financial aid of overseas Chinese, when there were more than three thousand of these structures. Today, approximately 1,800 diaolou are still standing, with the most in the towns of Shuikou, Tangkou, Baihe, Chikan, and Xiangang, in that order (see map in article by Batto).

In the late 19th and early 20th century, Kaiping was a region of major emigration abroad, and a melting pot of ideas and trends brought back by overseas Chinese, Huaqiao, made good.  As a consequence, many watchtowers incorporated architectural features from China and the West.  These were examples of the Qiaoxiang architecture.  The diaolou were built by villagers during a time of chaos and served two purposes: housing and protecting against forays by bandits.

In 2007, the Kaiping diaolou and villages were added to the list of UNESCO World Heritage Sites and consist of four separate restored village areas: Zilicun village in Tangkou, Sanmenli village in Chikan, Jinjiangli village in Xiangang, and Majianglong village cluster in Baihe township.

The Kaiping diaolou was the location for parts of the filming of 2010 movie Let the Bullets Fly.

Examples of diaolous include:
 Yinglonglou, oldest extant diaolou in Kaiping, in the village of Sanmenli (Chikan township) built by the Guan lineage during the Jiajing era of the Ming dynasty (1522-1566), is a massive three-storey fortress with one-meter thick walls, in contrast with the high tower diaolou built much later with the aid of Huaqiao.
 Jinjiangli Diaolou Cluster, situated behind Jinjiangli Village (Xiangang Township), includes three exquisite diaolous: Ruishi Lou, Shengfeng Lou, and Jinjiang Lou. Ruishi Diaolou, constructed in 1921, has nine floors and is the tallest diaolou in Kaiping. It features a Byzantine style roof and a Roman dome.
 The Majianglong diaolou cluster is spread across five villages (Baihe township) in a bamboo forest: Yong'an and Nan'an Villages of the Huang family; Hedong, Qinglin, and Longjiang Villages of the Guan family. 
 Zilicun Diaolou Cluster, located in Zilicun Village (Tangkou township), includes nine diaolous, the largest number among the four Kaiping villages designated by UNESCO. They feature the fusion of Chinese and various Western architectural styles and rise up surrealistically over the rice paddy fields.
 Fangshi Denglou - Built in 1920 after contributions from villagers, this denglou is five storeys high. It is referred to as the "Light Tower" because it had an enormous searchlight as bright as the beam of a lighthouse.
 Li Garden, in Beiyi Xiang, was constructed in 1936 by Mr. Xie Weili, a Chinese emigrant to the United States.
 Bianchouzhu Lou (The Leaning Tower), located in Nanxing Village was constructed in 1903. It has seven floors.
 Nan Lou, or the "Southern Diaolou", located on the riverbank in Chikan township, which was known for seven local soldiers by the surname Situ who died defending Chikan from the Japanese.

Chikan

Chikan is officially designated as a National Historic and Cultural Town of China.  The old town of Chikan has many historical sites that are about one hundred years old.  For example, it has over 600 late-Qing and early-Republic historic Tong laus or Qilous continuous, spanning over a length of 3 kilometers, including the riverside stretch along Dixi Lu, sometimes referred to as 'European Styled Street'. Part of old Chikan town has been designated Chikan Studio City for filming of historical scenes.

Chikan township also has two restored diaolous:  Yinglonglou, built by the Guan lineage in the Ming dynasty, and Nanlou, memorialized by the martyrdom of seven Situ clan members in the early 20th century.

Historically, Chikan has been shaped by these two competing clans. One example is the existence of two libraries: the Situ's library, opened in 1926, and, not to be outdone, the Guan's library, opened in 1931; both libraries funded by overseas Chinese and incorporated architecture features from overseas.

It is a famous and well-known location for braised pork in noodles to locals.

Chikan is to become a tourist destination and the closing of local stores, dining posts, and streets are scheduled for the summer of 2017.

Miscellaneous
Kaiping has been twinned with Mesa, Arizona, United States, since October 18, 1993.

Kaiping was a major source of emigrants at the turn of the 20th century. As a result, a large number of early Chinese Canadian and Chinese American communities had people who originated from Kaiping and its neighboring counties of Taishan, Enping and Xinhui, which is known collectively as Sze Yup. It is said that there are more Kaipingnese people living abroad today than there are Kaipingnese in Kaiping.  In a 2016 report, Deloitte estimated that there are 750,000 Kaiping-born overseas Chinese.

In 1973, various people originated from Kaiping started the Hoi Ping Chamber of Commerce Secondary School in Hong Kong.

Climate

Notes

References

Citations

4. < 廣東省廣州市佛山地區韶關地區沿革地理》( history and geographical cha es of Guangzhou region, foshan region and shaoguan region )

Bibliography
 , reprinted 2000.
Guangdong Zheng Guangzhou shi fishan di qu shaoguan di qu yuan he di Li ( history of geographical alterations of Guangzhou, Foshan and Shaoguan Author: Zhu, peng Xur Lin publishing limited 1984

External links

 Kaiping government website
 UNESCO World Heritage Convention: Kaiping Diaolou and Villages
 Deloitte 德勤: Research Report on Investment Environment - Kaiping, Guangdong 2016
 Kaiping Press Release for future high speed rail station

 
World Heritage Sites in China
Jiangmen
County-level cities in Guangdong